Peridier is an impact crater on Mars, located in the Syrtis Major quadrangle. It was named after French electrical engineer and amateur astronomer Julien Peridier. The naming was approved by IAU's Working Group for Planetary System Nomenclature in 1973.

See also 
 List of craters on Mars: O-Z

References 

Syrtis Major quadrangle
Impact craters on Mars